Margaret Walker (Margaret Abigail Walker Alexander by marriage; July 7, 1915 – November 30, 1998) was an American poet and writer. She was part of the African-American literary movement in Chicago, known as the Chicago Black Renaissance. Her notable works include For My People (1942) which won the Yale Series of Younger Poets Competition, and the novel Jubilee (1966), set in the South during the American Civil War.

Biography
Walker was born in Birmingham, Alabama, to Sigismund C. Walker, a minister, and Marion (née Dozier) Walker, who helped their daughter by teaching her philosophy and poetry as a child. Her family moved to New Orleans when Walker was a young girl. At the age of 15, she showed a few of her poems to Langston Hughes, on a speaking tour at the moment, who recognized her talent. She attended school there, including several years of college, before she moved north to Chicago.

In 1935, Walker received her Bachelor of Arts degree from Northwestern University. In 1936 she began work with the Federal Writers' Project under the Works Progress Administration of the President Franklin D. Roosevelt administration during the Great Depression. She worked alongside other young writers like Gwendolyn Brooks and Frank Yerby. She was a member of the South Side Writers Group, which included authors such as Richard Wright, Arna Bontemps, Fenton Johnson, Theodore Ward, and Frank Marshall Davis.

In 1942, she received her master's degree in creative writing from the University of Iowa. In 1965, she returned to that school to earn her Ph.D.

Walker married Firnist Alexander in 1943 and moved to Mississippi to be with him. They had four children together and lived in the Medgar Evers Historic District (formerly Elraine Subdivision) in the capital of Jackson.

Academic career
Walker became a literature professor at what is today Jackson State University, an historically black college, where she taught from 1949 to 1979. In 1968, Walker founded the Institute for the Study of History, Life, and Culture of Black People (now the Margaret Walker Center) and her personal papers are now stored there. In 1976, she went on to serve as the institute's director.

Literary writing
In 1942, Walker's poetry collection For My People won the Yale Series of Younger Poets Competition under the judgeship of editor Stephen Vincent Benét, making her the first black woman to receive a national writing prize. Her For My People was considered the "most important collection of poetry written by a participant in the Chicago Black Renaissance before Gwendolyn Brooks's A Street in Bronzeville." Richard Barksdale says: "The [title] poem was written when "world-wide pain, sorrow, and affliction were tangibly evident, and few could isolate the Black man's dilemma from humanity's dilemma during the depression years or during the war years." He said that the power of resilience presented in the poem is a hope Walker holds out not only to black people, but to all people, to "all the Adams and Eves."

Walker's second published book (and only novel), Jubilee (1966), is the story of a slave family during and after the Civil War, and is based on her great-grandmother's life. It took her thirty years to write. Roger Whitlow says: "It serves especially well as a response to white 'nostalgia' fiction about the antebellum and Reconstruction South."

This book is considered important in African-American literature. Walker was the first of a generation of women who started publishing more novels in the 1970s.

In 1975, Walker released three albums of poetry on Folkways Records – Margaret Walker Alexander Reads Poems of Paul Laurence Dunbar and James Weldon Johnson and Langston Hughes; Margaret Walker Reads Margaret Walker and Langston Hughes; and The Poetry of Margaret Walker.

Walker received a Candace Award from the National Coalition of 100 Black Women in 1989.

Court cases
In 1978, Margaret Walker sued Alex Haley, claiming that his 1976 novel Roots: The Saga of an American Family had violated Jubilee's copyright by borrowing from her novel. The case was dismissed.

In 1991 Walker was sued by Ellen Wright, the widow of Richard Wright, on the grounds that Walker's use of unpublished letters and an unpublished journal in a just-published biography of Wright violated the widow's copyright. Wright v. Warner Books was dismissed by the district court, and this judgment was supported by the appeals court.

Death and legacy
Walker died of breast cancer in Chicago, Illinois, in 1998, aged 83.

Walker was inducted into The Chicago Literary Hall of Fame in 2014.

Walker was honored with a historical marker through the Mississippi Writers Trail.

Works
  (reprint 1968)

Papers
Galley sheets for Jubilee and original pre-corrected copy of A Poetic Equation at Millsaps-Wilson Library, Millsaps College, Jackson, Mississippi
Margaret Walker Alexander Room and Collection, Jackson State University

Film biography
 For My People, The Life and Writing of Margaret Walker, distributed by California Newsreel.

Poetry and music
Margaret Walker's evocative poetry has inspired new musical compositions by 20th and 21st-century composers. Inspired works include Randy Klein's 2011 For My People — The Margaret Walker Song Cycle, a song cycle for choir (formerly entitled Lineage), and Edward W. Hardy's 2022 BORN FREE, a song cycle for soprano, violin and piano.

Further reading
Song of My Life: A Biography of Margaret Walker by Carolyn J. Brown, published 2014. This is the first biography of Margaret Walker.

References

External links
 
 Margaret Walker at Smithsonian Folkways
 "Margaret Walker: Select Bibliography", Modern American Poetry.
 Margaret Walker at the Poetry Foundation

1915 births
1998 deaths
African-American novelists
African-American poets
American women novelists
American women poets
Federal Writers' Project people
Yale Younger Poets winners
Iowa Writers' Workshop alumni
Jackson State University faculty
Northwestern University alumni
University of Iowa alumni
American Methodists
Deaths from breast cancer
Writers from Birmingham, Alabama
Writers from Chicago
20th-century African-American writers
20th-century American novelists
20th-century American poets
20th-century American women writers
Novelists from Illinois
Novelists from Mississippi
Novelists from Alabama
20th-century African-American women writers